Aetholaimidae is a family of nematodes belonging to the order Dorylaimida.

Genera:
 Aetholaimus Williams, 1962

References

Nematodes